The 2016 NCAA Rifle Championships were contested at the 37th annual NCAA-sanctioned competition to determine the team and individual national champions of co-ed collegiate rifle shooting in the United States. 

The championships were held at the Stile Athletics Field House at the University of Akron in Akron, Ohio.

Three-time defending champions West Virginia again won the team championship, the Mountaineers' eighteenth NCAA national title in rifle.

West Virginia's Ginny Thrasher became the fifth person to win both individual championships and the first since 2013.

Qualification
With only one national collegiate championship for rifle shooting, all NCAA rifle programs (whether from Division I, Division II, or Division III) were eligible. A total of eight teams contested this championship.

Results
Scoring:  The championship consisted of 60 shots for both smallbore and air rifle per team.

Team title
(DC) = Defending champions
Italics = Inaugural championship
† = Team won center shot tiebreaker

Individual events

References

NCAA Rifle Championship
NCAA Rifle Championships
2016 in shooting sports
NCAA Rifle Championships